

Poem is the tenth studio album released by Canadian industrial/electronic music group Delerium in 2000.

"Innocente," "Underwater," and "Aria" have music videos.

Track listing
All songs written by Bill Leeb and all lyrics written by respective vocalists unless otherwise noted.
There is also a misprinted European edition with the US track list. Only a few thousand albums were published this way.  The misprint is recognizable by the CDs being pressed in The Netherlands and the cover is green instead of brown.

The vocals of "Aria" are taken from the Mediæval Bæbes song "All Turns to Yesterday", from the album Worldes Blysse.

North American Release

Disc one
"Terra Firma" – 5:39
Vocals: Aude; chants by Chanticleer
"Innocente" – 6:29
Vocals: Leigh Nash
"Aria" – 6:50
Vocals: Mediæval Bæbes
"Fallen Icons" – 6:30
Vocals: Jenifer McLaren
"Underwater" – 5:21
Vocals: Rani Kamal
"Myth" – 6:10
Vocals: Joanna Stevens (of Solar Twins)
"Nature's Kingdom" (Leeb, Luke Doucet, Kirsty Hawkshaw) – 5:15
Vocals: Kirsty Hawkshaw
"Daylight" – 5:32
Vocals: Matthew Sweet
"Temptation" – 8:06
"A Poem for Byzantium" – 5:53
Vocals: Joanna Stevens
"Amongst the Ruins" – 10:27

Disc two
Included on the US limited edition.
"Silence" (Airscape Remix) (Leeb, Rhys Fulber, Sarah McLachlan) – 8:40
Vocals: Sarah McLachlan
"Flowers Become Screens" (Deepsky Remix) (Leeb, Fulber, Kristy Thirsk) – 7:59
Vocals: Kristy Thirsk
"Inner Sanctum" – 7:23
Vocals: Kirsty Hawkshaw
"Nature's Kingdom II" – 5:18
Vocals: Jenifer McLaren

European Releases

Disc one
"Innocente" – 6:29
"Nature's Kingdom" – 5:15
"Daylight" – 5:32
"Underwater" – 5:21
"Fallen Icons" – 6:30
"Aria" – 6:50
"Myth" – 6:10
"Inner Sanctum" – 7:23
"A Poem for Byzantium" – 5:53
"Amongst the Ruins" – 10:27
"Silence" (Airscape remix) – 4:05

Disc two
"Silence" (In Search of Sunrise Remix)
"Innocente" (Mr Sam's The Space Between Us remix)
"Heaven's Earth" (Matt Darey remix)
"Innocente" (DJ Tiesto remix)
"Silence" (Micheal Woods remix)
"Terra Firma"

Delerium albums
2000 albums
Nettwerk Records albums
Albums produced by Greg Reely